Governor Aker Observatory  is an astronomical observatory, part of Eastern Arizona College's Discovery Park Campus (formerly known as Discovery Park) in Safford, Arizona (US). Opening on November 18, 1995, the observatory became Discovery Park's first attraction. In addition to its telescope, a 20-inch Cassegrain reflector, it houses an astronomy exhibit gallery and a simulated voyage through the solar system aboard a "space shuttle".  Another of its attractions is a camera obscura, one of the world's largest. It also conducts tours of Mount Graham International Observatory.

See also 
List of observatories

References

External links
 Gov Aker Observatory Clear Sky Clock Forecasts of observing conditions.

Astronomical observatories in Arizona
Buildings and structures in Graham County, Arizona
Camera obscuras
Tourist attractions in Graham County, Arizona
Education in Graham County, Arizona
1995 establishments in Arizona